Bull Shoals Dam is a concrete gravity dam on the White River in northern Arkansas in the United States. The dam lies on the border of Marion and Baxter Counties, and forms Bull Shoals Lake, which extends well northwest into Missouri. Its main purposes are hydroelectricity production and flood control.

The dam was built by the U.S. Army Corps of Engineers in response to severe flooding between 1915 and 1927. President Franklin Delano Roosevelt authorized the construction of the dam as well as six others on the White River and its tributaries in the Flood Control Act of 1938. Construction started in June 1947 and the dam was completed in July 1951. When finished, the dam was one of the largest concrete structures in the world. From its completion until 2009, it is estimated that the dam has prevented about $225.5 million in flood damages.

References

Dams in Arkansas
Buildings and structures in Marion County, Arkansas
Buildings and structures in Baxter County, Arkansas
United States Army Corps of Engineers dams
Dams completed in 1951
Dams on the White River (Arkansas)